Florian Zeller (born 28 June 1979) is a French novelist, playwright, theatre director, screenwriter, and film director. He won the  Prix Interallié for his 2004 novel The Fascination of Evil and several awards for his plays. He wrote and directed his first film, 2020's The Father, based on his play of the same name, starring Anthony Hopkins and Olivia Colman. The film received six nominations at the 93rd Academy Awards, including Best Picture, with Zeller co-winning Best Adapted Screenplay. It also received four nominations at the 78th Golden Globe Awards and six nominations at the 74th British Academy Film Awards.

Biography
Zeller wrote his first novel Artificial Snow when he was twenty-two years old. But it was his third novel, The Fascination of Evil, which made him a household name in France. It was selected for the Prix Goncourt.

His play, The Father, played in London's West End to critical acclaim and top listings in the Best Plays of the Year. It was considered as "the most acclaimed new play of the last decade". and won several awards and nominations in Paris, London and New York. According to The Times, The Father is "one of the greatest plays of the century".

His comedy, The Truth, opened in London's West End in June 2017 and received an Olivier Award nomination for Best Comedy.

His play, The Height of the Storm, starring Jonathan Pryce and Eileen Atkins, opened in London's West End in September 2018 and on New York's Broadway in September 2019. It has been named "best play of 2018" and "one of the best plays of the 21st century" by The Guardian.

His play, The Mother, starring Isabelle Huppert, opened in New York in February 2019.

The Son opened in London in February 2019 and transferred to the West End in September 2019 with rave reviews.

His plays have been staged in more than 45 countries.

Films
Zeller wrote the screenplays for the 2008 film Castle in Sweden, the 2014 film Do Not Disturb, and the 2018 film The Other Woman. He wrote and directed his first film, 2020's The Father, based on his play. It had its world premiere at the Sundance Film Festival on January 27, 2020. The film received acclaim from critics, who lauded Hopkins and Colman's performances and praised its depiction of dementia. On review aggregator Rotten Tomatoes, the film holds an approval rating of 98% based on 165 reviews, with an average rating of 8.50/10. The website's critics consensus reads: "Led by stellar performances and artfully helmed by writer-director Florian Zeller, The Father presents a devastatingly empathetic portrayal of dementia." At Metacritic, it has a weighted average score of 88 out of 100, based on 42 critics, indicating "universal acclaim". At the 78th Golden Globe Awards, the film received four nominations, including Best Motion Picture – Drama. It also received six nominations at the 74th British Academy Film Awards, including Best Film, and six Oscars nominations. Zeller and Christopher Hampton won a BAFTA and an Academy Award for Best Adapted Screenplay for the film.

In March and April 2021, it was announced that Zeller co-wrote with Christopher Hampton and will direct their adaptation of The Son (which serves as Zeller's and Hampton's follow-up to The Father), with Hugh Jackman, Laura Dern and Vanessa Kirby to star in the film.

Personal life
Zeller lives in Paris. In 2010, he married ex-model, actress and sculptor Marine Delterme, who played one of the main roles in the Parisian production of his play Le Manège. Their son, Roman, was born in December 2008.

Plays
2004: L'Autre
2005: Le Manège
2006: Si tu mourais
2008: Elle t'attend
2010: The Mother (2015 in London, 2019 in New York)
2011: The Truth (2017 in London)
2012: Le Père (The Father) (2014 in London, 2016 in New York, adapted into the 2015 film Floride and the 2020 film The Father)
2013: Une heure de tranquillité (adapted into the 2014 film Do Not Disturb)
2014: The Lie (2017 in London)
2016: L'Envers du décor (adapted into the 2018 film The Other Woman)
2016: The Height of the Storm (2018 in London)
2018: Le Fils (The Son) (2019 in London, adapted into the 2022 film The Son)
2021: The Forest (2021 in London)

Filmography
2008: Castle in Sweden (writer)
2014: Do Not Disturb (writer)
2018: The Other Woman (writer)
2020: The Father (writer and director)
2022: The Son (writer and director)

Novels
2002: Artificial Snow
2003: Lovers or Something Like It
2004: The Fascination of Evil
2006: Julien Parme
2012: La Jouissance

Awards and nominations

References

External links

 
 Works at Flammarion

1979 births
Living people
Writers from Paris
21st-century French novelists
French film directors
French male screenwriters
French theatre directors
21st-century French dramatists and playwrights
Prix Interallié winners
French male novelists
Chevaliers of the Ordre des Arts et des Lettres
21st-century French male writers
21st-century French screenwriters
Best Adapted Screenplay Academy Award winners